Charles Manners-Sutton, 1st Viscount Canterbury,  (9 January 1780 – 21 July 1845) was a British Tory politician who served as Speaker of the House of Commons from 1817 to 1835.

Background and education
A member of the Manners family headed by the Duke of Rutland, Manners-Sutton was born at Screveton, Nottinghamshire, the son of the Most Reverend Charles Manners-Sutton, Archbishop of Canterbury, fourth son of Lord George Manners-Sutton, third son of John Manners, 3rd Duke of Rutland. His mother was Mary, daughter of Thomas Thoroton, of Screveton, Nottinghamshire, while Thomas Manners-Sutton, 1st Baron Manners, Lord Chancellor of Ireland, was his uncle.

He was educated at Eton College and Trinity College, Cambridge (matriculated 1798, graduated B.A. 1802, M.A. 1805, LL.D. 1824). He was admitted to Lincoln's Inn in 1802, and called to the Bar in 1806.

Political career
In 1806 Manners-Sutton was elected Tory Member of Parliament for Scarborough, a seat he would hold until 1832, and then sat for Cambridge University from 1832 to 1835. He served as Judge Advocate General under Spencer Perceval and Lord Liverpool from 1809 to 1817 and was admitted to the Privy Council in 1809.

Manners-Sutton was elected Speaker of the House of Commons in the 1817 election, holding the post for the next eighteen years. Antonia Fraser described Manners-Sutton as "a fine, friendly, genial figure, if inclined to pomposity (but that was a forgivable offence in a Speaker)." Manners-Sutton, notably, was Speaker during the passing of the Reform Act 1832. Following the King's prorogation of Parliament, Manners-Sutton led an angry group of MPs to the House of Lords to hear his proclamation. Manners-Sutton himself was said to be "red-faced and quivering with rage" at the news.

When Lord Grey resigned as Prime Minister in May 1832, this caused a period of political unrest known as the Days of May. The King asked the Duke of Wellington to form a government to replace Grey's, but he was reluctant to do so. Nevertheless, according to Fraser, "There was the possibility that... Charles Manners-Sutton might prove an acceptable anodyne leader because, by the nature of his office, he was not tarred by the brush of his own anti-Reform declarations." Manners-Sutton spent three hours outlining his views on the matter at "exhaustive and exhausting length" during a crucial meeting of the Tories at Apsley House. Following the meeting, Lyndhurst flung back his chair and exclaimed that he refused to listen any longer to such "a damned tiresome old bitch." Manners-Sutton was only the third candidate in contention to lead a Tory administration, behind Wellington and Sir Robert Peel. In the end, "he was understood to have declined" the opportunity to head the proposed Tory administration.

After the passing of the Reform Act, Manners-Sutton was persuaded to postpone his retirement as Speaker by the government. Objecting to him as an opponent of the reform, the Radicals opposed his re-election in the 1833 election, nominating Edward Littleton, whom Manners-Sutton defeated by 210 votes. In the 1835 election the Whigs opposed Manners-Sutton, nominating James Abercromby, who defeated Manners-Sutton by 10 votes.

In 1835 Manners-Sutton was appointed High Commissioner for Canada, but did not take up the post. He was appointed a Knight Grand Cross of the Order of the Bath in 1833 and in 1835 he was raised to the peerage as Baron Bottesford, of Bottesford in the County of Leicester, and Viscount Canterbury, of the City of Canterbury.

Family
Lord Canterbury was twice married.

He married as his first wife Lucy Maria Charlotte, daughter of John Denison, on 8 July 1811. They had two sons and a daughter:
 Charles John Manners-Sutton, 2nd Viscount Canterbury (1812–1869)
 John Henry Thomas Manners-Sutton, 3rd Viscount Canterbury (1814–1877)
 Charlotte Matilda Manners-Sutton (1815–1898)

After his first-wife's early death at Ossington, Nottinghamshire, in December 1815, he married as his second wife Ellen, daughter of Edmund Power and widow of John Home Purves, on 6 December 1828. They had one daughter:
 Frances Diana Manners-Sutton (1829–1874)

Lord Canterbury died at Southwick Crescent, Paddington, London, in July 1845, aged 65, from apoplexy, and was succeeded by his eldest son, Charles. His second wife only survived him by a few months and died at Clifton, Gloucestershire, in November 1845.

Arms

References

Citations

Sources
 Fraser, Antonia (2014). Perilous Question: The Drama of the Great Reform Bill 1832. London: Phoenix.
 Shenton, Caroline (2013). The Day Parliament Burned Down. Oxford: Oxford University Press.

External links 

 

1780 births
1845 deaths
People educated at Eton College
Alumni of Trinity College, Cambridge
Viscounts in the Peerage of the United Kingdom
Knights Grand Cross of the Order of the Bath
Manners-Sutton, Charles
Manners-Sutton, Charles
Manners-Sutton, Charles
Members of the Privy Council of the United Kingdom
Tory MPs (pre-1834)
Manners-Sutton, Charles
Manners-Sutton, Charles
Manners-Sutton, Charles
Manners-Sutton, Charles
Manners-Sutton, Charles
Manners-Sutton, Charles
Manners-Sutton, Charles
Manners-Sutton, Charles
Manners-Sutton, Charles
UK MPs who were granted peerages
Charles
Peers of the United Kingdom created by William IV